The Roman Catholic Diocese of Katiola is a Roman Catholic diocese in the Ecclesiastical province of Korhogo in Côte d'Ivoire.

History

 May 15, 1952: Established as Apostolic Vicariate of Katiola from the Apostolic Prefecture of Korhogo 
 September 14, 1955: Promoted as Diocese of Katiola

Special churches
The seat of the bishop is the Cathédrale Jeanne d’Arc in Katiola.

Leadership

Ordinaries, in reverse chronological order
 Bishops of Katiola, below
 Bishop Ignace Bessi Dogbo (since 2004.03.19)
 Bishop Marie-Daniel Dadiet (2002.10.10 – 2004.05.12), appointed Archbishop of Korhogo
 Bishop Jean-Marie Kélétigui (1977.07.07 – 2002.10.10)
 Bishop Emile Durrheimer, S.M.A. (1955.09.14 – 1977.07.07); see below
 Vicar Apostolic of Katiola (Roman rite), below.  This is the former Vicariate Apostolic of Korhogo, and when it was changed, the then-Father Durrheimer became a titular Bishop, continuing as Ordinary.
 Bishop Emile Durrheimer, S.M.A. (1952.05.15 – 1955.09.14); see above

Other priest of this diocese who became bishop
Antoine Koné, appointed Bishop of Odienné in 2009

See also
Roman Catholicism in Côte d'Ivoire
 List of Roman Catholic dioceses in Côte d'Ivoire

References

External links
GCatholic.org

Katiola
Christian organizations established in 1952
Roman Catholic dioceses and prelatures established in the 20th century
Hambol
1952 establishments in French West Africa
Katiola